Frost grape is a common name which may refer to any of the following species of grapevine:

Vitis riparia, native to North America
Vitis vulpina, native to North America